Uma Jalanta (Aymara uma water, jalaña to fly, running of water, -nta a suffix, also spelled Huma Halanta, Umajalanta) is a mountain in the Cordillera Real in the Andes of Bolivia, about  high. It is located in the La Paz Department, Larecaja Province, Sorata Municipality. It lies south-east of the mountains Janq'u Uma and Janq'u Piti, near the mountain Misk'i T'ant'a.

References 

Mountains of La Paz Department (Bolivia)